Louis the Gorilla (born May 12, 1999) is a western lowland gorilla who is known for walking upright in order to avoid muddying his hands. A clip of Louis that was posted to the Philadelphia Zoo's Facebook page became popular and he gained international fame.

Life
Louis was born at the St. Louis Zoo on May 12, 1999 to his mother, Nne and father, Jabari. Louis arrived at the Philadelphia Zoo on July 13, 2004 along with his mother and father. In 2014, Louis moved into a bachelor troop with another gorilla, Kuchimba.

While Louis is very large, he is probably the shyest of all gorillas at the zoo according to his curator. However, he will charge at the glass on occasion.

Louis and another male, Kuchimba were transferred to the Zoo de Granby from the Philadelphia Zoo in February, 2020.

Upright walking
In March 2018, a video of Louis walking throughout his enclosure on two legs gained nearly 500,000 views in under a month on Facebook.

See also
 List of individual apes

References

Individual gorillas